William Robinson House may refer to:

William Robinson House (Sycamore, Illinois), a contributing property
William A. Robinson House, Auburn, Maine, listed on the NRHP in Androscoggin County, Maine
William P. Robinson House, Lexington, Missouri, listed on the NRHP in Lafayette County, Missouri
William Robinson House (300 West, Beaver, Utah), listed on the NRHP in Beaver County, Utah
William Robinson House (State Route 153, Beaver, Utah), listed on the NRHP in Beaver County, Utah

See also
Robinson House (disambiguation)